Hadriaan van Nes (born 7 August 1942) is a retired rower from the Netherlands, who won the silver medal in the coxed pairs at the 1968 Summer Olympics, alongside Roderick Rijnders and Herman Suselbeek. He won a world title in 1966 and a European bronze medal in 1965 in this event. His daughter Eeke van Nes also became an Olympic rower.

References

External links
 

1942 births
Living people
Dutch male rowers
Rowers at the 1968 Summer Olympics
Olympic rowers of the Netherlands
Olympic silver medalists for the Netherlands
Sportspeople from Gorinchem
Olympic medalists in rowing
World Rowing Championships medalists for the Netherlands
Medalists at the 1968 Summer Olympics
European Rowing Championships medalists
20th-century Dutch people
21st-century Dutch people